State Highway 152 (SH 152) is a Texas state highway that runs from Dumas east to the Oklahoma border. The route was originally designated in 1930 between Pampa and Wheeler, but was extended both west (replacing State Highway 209 from Pampa to Borger) and east to its current termini in 1938.

Route description
SH 152 begins at an intersection with an intersection with US 87 and US 287 in Dumas, and travels east through farmland along the outside northern edge of the Canadian River valley.  It reaches large oil reserves before reaching Stinnett and an intersection with Texas State Highway 136 and Texas State Highway 207.  All three routes travel south out of Stinnett 10 miles to Borger.  The route continues southeast through oil country before returning to fertile farmlands just west of Pampa, where it joins up with U.S. Route 60.  The two routes continue east out of Pampa for about 10 miles before SH 152 splits off and continues due east. The route continues east, reaching an intersection with US Route 83 in Wheeler, before crossing into Oklahoma onto State Highway 152 near Sweetwater, Oklahoma.

Route history
SH 152 was first designated on March 19, 1930 as the route between Pampa and Wheeler through northern Gray and Wheeler Counties as a renumbering of SH 33A. On December 24, 1935, a highway was temporarily designated from Wheeler to the Oklahoma state line. On April 19, 1938, the extension east to Oklahoma became official. On June 21, 1938, the route was extended west to Borger, replacing SH 209.  The route was also designated north concurrent with then-State Highway 117 until they reached Stinnett, where the route would be extended west via Dumas to Hartley, replacing SH 178. On July 15, 1938, SH 152 Spur was designated to Old Mobeetie. On October 24, 1938, SH 152 Spur was taken over. On September 26, 1939, the section from Dumas to Hartley was cancelled as it was cosigned with US 87. SH 152 Spur was renumbered as Spur 41. The road to Dumas already existed, but was not fully improved until the late 1940s.

Business route
Business State Highway 152-B is a business loop that runs through Stinett, from SH 136/SH 207 west to SH 152 west of the city. The route was created in 1939 as Loop 79, which was redesignated Business SH 152-B on June 21, 1990.

Junction list

References

152
Transportation in Moore County, Texas
Transportation in Hutchinson County, Texas
Transportation in Carson County, Texas
Transportation in Gray County, Texas
Transportation in Wheeler County, Texas